Gaj Koniemłocki is a village in the administrative district of Gmina Staszów, within Staszów County, Świętokrzyskie Voivodeship, in south-central Poland.

The village has a population of  87.

Based on other article, Gaj Koniemłocki by years 1975–1998 use to belong to Tarnobrzeg Voivodeship

Demography 
According to the 2002 Poland census, there were 91 people residing in Gaj Koniemłocki village, of whom 47.3% were male and 52.7% were female. In the village, the population was spread out, with 22% under the age of 18, 33% from 18 to 44, 18.7% from 45 to 64, and 26.4% who were 65 years of age or older.
 Figure 1. Population pyramid of village in 2002 – by age group and sex

References

Villages in Staszów County